Sports Club Kakhovka is a Ukrainian amateur football club from Kakhovka, Kherson Oblast. The club currently plays at the Askaniyske Experimental Facility Stadium. Throughout its history the club is better known for its names as Meliorator and Kzeso.

Brief history
The club was established sometime in 1980 as Avanhard Kakhovka. In 1988 after winning a prize of the local newspaper "Robitnycha Hazeta" (Worker's Gazette), it received a sponsor Agro-Industrial Complex "Krasa Khersonshchyny" (Beauty of the Kherson Region) and was renamed as Meliorator Kakhovka (Land cultivator). The club joined the Ukrainian competitions in 1992. In 1995 it lost its main sponsor and changed to FC Kakhovka. However that season was the most terrible and after the first half, the club withdrew from competitions as the city authorities could find means to continue funding the team. 

Later in 1999 the club returned to regional competitions as Chumak Kakhovka being sponsored by the Swedish-Ukrainian company Chumak. In 2001 the club was sold to the Kakhovka Factory of Electrical Welding Equipment (KZEZO or Kzeso in Russian interpretation) and in 2002 it joined the amateur competitions. From 2002 to 2005 KZEZO quite successfully competed at the amateur league winning the league twice and qualified to the UEFA Regions Cup where it earned the third place. In 2006 the club was dissolved and reformed again as SC Kakhovka.

Previous names 
First club (1980–2006):
 1980–1988: Avanhard Kakhovka
 1988–1995: Meliorator Kakhovka
 1995–1999: FC Kakhovka
 1999–2001: Chumak Kakhovka
 2001–2006: KZEZO Kakhovka

Second club (since 2006):
 2006–2011: SC Kakhovka
 2017–present: SC Kakhovka

Honours
 UEFA Regions' Cup
  2005

 Ukrainian football championship among amateurs (Ukrainian 4th Tier)
  2002, 2004
  2003

 Kherson Oblast football championship (Ukrainian Lower Tier)
  1988, 1999, 2001, 2002, 2004

League and cup history

Soviet Union
{|class="wikitable"
|-bgcolor="#efefef"
! Season
! Div.
! Pos.
! Pl.
! W
! D
! L
! GS
! GA
! P
!Domestic Cup
!colspan=2|Europe
!Notes
|- 
|align=center colspan=14|Meliorator Kakhovka
|- bgcolor=SteelBlue
|align=center|1989
|align=center|4th KFK Ukrainian SSR Gr. 4
|align=center bgcolor=tan|3/13
|align=center|24
|align=center|14
|align=center|4
|align=center|6
|align=center|43
|align=center|19
|align=center|32
|align=center|
|align=center|
|align=center|
|align=center bgcolor=brick|Reorganization of competitions
|- bgcolor=SteelBlue
|align=center|1990
|align=center|5th KFK Ukrainian SSR Gr. 5
|align=center bgcolor=silver|2/16
|align=center|30
|align=center|21
|align=center|5
|align=center|4
|align=center|61
|align=center|18
|align=center|47
|align=center|
|align=center|
|align=center|
|align=center|
|- bgcolor=SteelBlue
|align=center|1991
|align=center|5th KFK Ukrainian SSR Gr. 4
|align=center bgcolor=silver|2/16
|align=center|30
|align=center|21
|align=center|5
|align=center|4
|align=center|73
|align=center|27
|align=center|47
|align=center|
|align=center|
|align=center|
|align=center bgcolor=brick|Reorganization of competitions
|}

Ukraine
{|class="wikitable"
|-bgcolor="#efefef"
! Season
! Div.
! Pos.
! Pl.
! W
! D
! L
! GS
! GA
! P
!Domestic Cup
!colspan=2|Europe
!Notes
|- align=center bgcolor=PowderBlue
|align=center|1992
|align=center|3rd Transitional League Gr. B
|align=center bgcolor=tan|3/9
|align=center|16
|align=center|8
|align=center|5
|align=center|3
|align=center|21
|align=center|16
|align=center|21
|align=center|
|align=center|
|align=center|
|align=center|
|- align=center bgcolor=PowderBlue
|align=center|1992–93
|align=center|3rd Second League
|align=center|5/18
|align=center|34
|align=center|16
|align=center|9
|align=center|9
|align=center|45
|align=center|37
|align=center|41
|align=center| finals
|align=center|
|align=center|
|align=center|
|- align=center bgcolor=PowderBlue
|align=center|1993–94
|align=center|3rd Second League
|align=center|6/22
|align=center|42
|align=center|18
|align=center|12
|align=center|12
|align=center|56
|align=center|37
|align=center|48
|align=center| finals
|align=center|
|align=center|
|align=center|
|- align=center bgcolor=PowderBlue
|align=center|1994–95
|align=center|3rd Second League
|align=center|9/22
|align=center|42
|align=center|21
|align=center|9
|align=center|12
|align=center|49
|align=center|40
|align=center|72
|align=center| finals
|align=center|
|align=center|
|align=center|
|- 
|align=center colspan=14|FC Kakhovka
|- align=center bgcolor=PowderBlue
|align=center|1995–96
|align=center|3rd Second League Gr. A
|align=center|21/22
|align=center|40
|align=center|3
|align=center|3
|align=center|34
|align=center|11
|align=center|49
|align=center|12
|align=center| finals
|align=center|
|align=center|
|align=center bgcolor=lightgrey|Withdrew
|-
|align=center colspan=14|...
|- 
|align=center colspan=14|KZEZO (KZESO) Kakhovka
|- align=center bgcolor=SteelBlue
|align=center|2002
|align=center|4th Amateur League Gr. D
|align=center bgcolor=gold|1/4
|align=center|6
|align=center|6
|align=center|0
|align=center|0
|align=center|13
|align=center|1
|align=center|18
|align=center|
|align=center|
|align=center|
|align=center|Final group (1/4)
|- align=center bgcolor=SteelBlue
|align=center|2003
|align=center|4th Amateur League Gr. E
|align=center bgcolor=gold|1/5
|align=center|8
|align=center|6
|align=center|1
|align=center|1
|align=center|18
|align=center|11
|align=center|19
|align=center|
|align=center|
|align=center|
|align=center|Final group (2/4)
|- align=center bgcolor=SteelBlue
|align=center|2004
|align=center|4th Amateur League Gr. E
|align=center bgcolor=gold|1/4
|align=center|4
|align=center|2
|align=center|1
|align=center|1
|align=center|8
|align=center|2
|align=center|7
|align=center|
|align=center|
|align=center|
|align=center|Final (Winners)
|- align=center bgcolor=SteelBlue
|align=center|2005
|align=center|4th Amateur League Gr. 3
|align=center bgcolor=silver|2/5
|align=center|6
|align=center|3
|align=center|0
|align=center|3
|align=center|10
|align=center|10
|align=center|9
|align=center|
|align=center|
|align=center|
|align=center|
|-
|align=center colspan=14|...
|- 
|align=center colspan=14|SC Kakhovka
|- align=center bgcolor=SteelBlue
|align=center|2017–18
|align=center|4th Amateur League Gr. 3
|align=center|6/9
|align=center|16
|align=center|5
|align=center|4
|align=center|7
|align=center|23
|align=center|29
|align=center|19
|align=center|
|align=center|
|align=center|
|align=center|
|- align=center bgcolor=SteelBlue
|align=center|2018–19
|align=center|4th Amateur League Gr. 3
|align=center|4/12
|align=center|22
|align=center|10
|align=center|7
|align=center|5
|align=center|32
|align=center|18
|align=center|37
|align=center|
|align=center|
|align=center|
|align=center|
|- align=center bgcolor=SteelBlue
|align=center|2019–20
|align=center|4th Amateur League Gr. 3
|align=center|5/10
|align=center|18
|align=center|10
|align=center|3
|align=center|5
|align=center|32
|align=center|24
|align=center|33
|align=center|
|align=center|
|align=center|
|align=center|
|- align=center bgcolor=SteelBlue
|align=center|2020–21
|align=center|4th Amateur League Gr. 3
|align=center|7/12
|align=center|22
|align=center|9
|align=center|3
|align=center|10
|align=center|35
|align=center|26
|align=center|30
|align=center|
|align=center|
|align=center|
|align=center|
|- align=center bgcolor=SteelBlue
|align=center|2021–22
|align=center|4th Amateur League Gr. 3
|align=center|7/9
|align=center|8
|align=center|2
|align=center|1
|align=center|5
|align=center|8
|align=center|23
|align=center|7
|align=center|
|align=center|
|align=center|
|align=center|
|}

External links
 Fan blog
 Valerko, A. SC Kakhovka: a city with traditions, African diaspora and a Guinness record holder (СК «Каховка»: місто з традиціями, африканська діаспора та рекордсмен Гіннеса). AAFU. 1 March 2018
 SC Kakhovka at AAFU

 
Amateur football clubs in Ukraine
Football clubs in Kherson Oblast
Association football clubs established in 1980
1980 establishments in Ukraine
Kakhovka